Giosuè Stucchi  (13 March 1931 – 10 May 2021) was an Italian professional footballer who played as a midfielder.

He played for seven seasons (168 games, 2 goals) in the Serie A for Udinese Calcio and A.S. Roma.

In 1956 he seriously injured Oscar Massei, which prevented Massei from making his debut for the Italy national team, for which he was called up. Massei ended up never playing for Italy.

References

External links
Profile at Enciclopediadelcalcio.it

1931 births
2021 deaths
Sportspeople from the Province of Monza e Brianza
Italian footballers
Association football midfielders
Serie A players
Serie B players
Udinese Calcio players
A.S. Roma players
Brescia Calcio players
Vigevano Calcio players
Footballers from Lombardy